Kkehna Hai Kuch Mujhko is a TV series by Balaji Telefilms, broadcast on Sony Entertainment Television, from 11 March 2004 to 2005. It aired Friday to Sunday 8:30 PM

The serial showed Pallavi Joshi as protagonist Reva Kapoor, and her journey from a dutiful wife and mother to a working woman.

Swapna Waghmare Joshi was the director of the serial and script was by Mushtaq Shaikh.

Plot 
Reva has been a devoted mother and dutiful wife all her life. She has always put her own ambitions on the back burner, while dealing with demanding kids and a controlling husband. She decides to join work and find her identity as an individual. She has a supportive mother-in-law (Surekha Sikri) and friend (Ronit Roy as Ishan) who help her out in this quest. However, problems in her errant children's life and her husband's (Nishchay Kapoor, played by Kiran Karmarkar) extra-marital affair complicate things.

Cast 
 Pallavi Joshi as Reva Kapoor 
 Kiran Karmarkar as Nishchay Kapoor 
 Surekha Sikri as Nishchay's mother 
 Vivan Bhatena  
 Ronit Roy as Ishan Masand

References

External links 
 
 Production Website

Balaji Telefilms television series
Sony Entertainment Television original programming
2004 Indian television series debuts
2005 Indian television series endings